Wong Ting Ting (born 11 September 2003) is a Hong Kong para table tennis player. She won one of the bronze medals in the women's C11 event at the 2020 Summer Paralympics held in Tokyo, Japan.

References

Living people
2003 births
Hong Kong female table tennis players
Paralympic table tennis players of Hong Kong
Paralympic bronze medalists for Hong Kong
Paralympic medalists in table tennis
Table tennis players at the 2020 Summer Paralympics
Medalists at the 2020 Summer Paralympics
Place of birth missing (living people)
21st-century Hong Kong women